Aporpium is a genus of fungi in the order Auriculariales. Basidiocarps (fruit bodies) are formed on dead wood and have a poroid hymenium. Species were often formerly referred to the genera Elmerina or Protomerulius, but molecular research, based on cladistic analysis of DNA sequences, has shown that Aporpium is a distinct, mainly north temperate genus.

References

Auriculariales
Agaricomycetes genera